Destiny Williams, also known as Cliffhanger, is an American basketball forward for the Baylor Lady Bears. Nationally ranked as the No. 8 senior according to ESPN HoopGurlz Williams attended the Nike Skills Regional Academy in 2007.

Playing career

Baylor Lady Bears
Destiny transferred from Illinois and has enrolled at Baylor. Won a national championship with Baylor during the 2011–12 season.

Illinois Fighting Illini

2009-10
As a McDonald's All-America selection, she is the first Illinois signee ever to receive the honor. She also considered Maryland, Georgia and Louisville before choosing Illinois.

Team USA
She was named to the U.S. U19 National Team in the summer of 2009 and will compete with Team USA at the U19 World Championships July 23-Aug. 2 in Bangkok, Thailand

High school
As sophomore in 2006, she averaged 25.3 points, 14.9 rebounds, 3.5 assists, 2.3 steals. In her junior year, she had 24.5 points, 13.9 rebounds, 4.2 blocks and 3.7 as a junior and led her school to a 17–2 record. As a senior, she averaged 29.9 points, 16.1 rebounds, 6.2 assists and 4.5 blocks. Williams led Benton Harbor to the Class A state championship. On Saturday, March 21, Williams scored 19 of her game-leading 31 points in the first half as Benton Harbor routed Franklin 60–46 at Eastern Michigan University to win its first girls state championship.

Career at Baylor: Her junior season, she was a member of the Baylor Bears women national championship team during the 2011–12 season. Was 2nd on the team in rebounding with 9.1 a contest, third in scoring at 10.1 ppg. Earned the team's Rebounding Award. Selected to both the Final Four and Des Moines Regional All-Tournament teams. Earned honorable mention WBCA All-American honors. Named All-Big 12 second team and to the Big 12 Championship All-Tournament team.

Player stats - Illinois and Baylor
Source

USA Basketball

Williams was named to the USA Women's U19 team which represented the US in the 2009 U19 World's Championship, held in Bangkok, Thailand in July and August 2009. Although the USA team lost the opening game to Spain, they went on to win their next seven games to earn a rematch against Spain in the finals, and won the game 81–71 to earn the gold medal. Williams scored 4.5 points per game.

Awards and honors
2008-09 Gatorade Michigan Girls Basketball Player of the Year
WBCA high school All-American
 Named 2008 Michigan Class A Player of the Year by the Associated Press (2007–08)
All- State, Michigan Coaches Association, 2006
First Team, All Conference, 2006
All State, Associated Press, 2006
MVP, Benton Harbor H.S., 2006
First Team, Detroit News, 2006
Honorable Mention, All-America, Street & Smith, 2006
All-State (AP and Coaches), All-Conference and All-City accolades ... Attended the Nike Skills Regional Academy in 2007 ... Plays for the Michigan Crossover AAU team along with fellow Illini signee Brianna Jones ...

References

1991 births
Living people
Basketball players from Michigan
Baylor Bears women's basketball players
McDonald's High School All-Americans
Parade High School All-Americans (girls' basketball)
Centers (basketball)
American women's basketball players